Ridge is an unincorporated community hamlet in Morgan County, West Virginia. It is located along Valley Road (U.S. Highway 522) at its intersection with Fish Hatchery Road (CR 38/10) near the Frederick County, Virginia line. Sleepy Creek and Timber Ridge lie to its east with Warm Springs Ridge lying to its west.

History
The community was named for the fact the town site rests upon a ridge.

References

Unincorporated communities in Morgan County, West Virginia
Unincorporated communities in West Virginia